Sir James Shaw, 1st Baronet (26 August 1764 – 22 October 1843), became Lord Mayor of London in 1805. From humble beginnings in a farming family in Ayrshire, he became a successful merchant and politician; he was a relation of Robert Burns and used his wealth to support Burns's orphaned children. As Lord Mayor of London, he led the funeral procession of Lord Nelson in 1806, having established his right to do so and was created baronet twice, in 1809 and 1813. While later Chamberlain of London, he almost lost his own fortune due to injudicious investments, and died, exonerated, in 1843.

Early life and career
Shaw was born on 26 August 1764, in Riccarton, Kilmarnock, Scotland, the son of a "respectable farmer", John Shaw, whose family had farmed the area of Mosshead for over 300 years, and Hellen Sellars. On the death of his father, the family moved to Kilmarnock, and Shaw studied at the local grammar school.

At the age of 17, he followed his elder brother to America to seek work, returning after three years to take up a position in the same company's London offices and becoming a junior partner in the firm. He became a wealthy merchant and financially assisted the children of Robert Burns after Burns's death in 1796. He was elected alderman for Portsoken in 1798 and became Sheriff of London and Middlesex in 1803.

Lord Mayor of London
  
Shaw had developed a reputation as a "gentleman and a citizen" and was sponsored for the office of Lord Mayor of London by the Scriveners' Company, and became only the second member of that guild to achieve that honour.

Having taken office in 1805, Shaw determined to re-establish the tradition whereby the Lord Mayor took precedence in public processions within the City of London over all except the reigning monarch, and took the opportunity of the funeral of Lord Nelson in 1806 to do so. According to one account, Shaw discussed the matter with the Prime Minister, Lord Liverpool, who was aware that the Prince Regent would be attending the funeral, but did not seem willing to take action. Shaw then offered to visit the King himself at Windsor Castle to resolve the matter, and Liverpool said that he would see what could be done. By the following day, the Royal Warrant of Precedence had been granted, and Shaw duly led the procession.

Baronetcy and later career
Shaw was created Baronet, of Kilmarnock, in the County of Ayr by George III in 1809, and re-created in 1813 by a second patent to include a future interest for his nephew. As such, he was appointed a Member of Parliament for London until 1818, but thereafter sat as an alderman until he resigned in May 1843. In 1831 he was also appointed Chamberlain of London, and was almost ruined as he inadvertently invested £40,000, then a huge sum, of city funds in fake Exchequer bills. On discovering his error, he began to liquidate all his property to repay the sum, but was cleared by a commission of enquiry. Shaw resigned all his positions in 1843 due to long-term illness and died some six months later on 22 October. Shaw was unmarried, and normally his baronetcy would have become extinct on his death, but because of the second patent, the title passed to his nephew, John Shaw.

Shaw was also President of St Bartholomew's Hospital from 1806 to 1831 and President of the Honourable Artillery Company from 1829 to 1843.

Legacy
Shaw is commemorated in Kilmarnock town centre by a statue of Carrara marble, about 17 feet tall, on a base of Aberdeen granite, executed by sculptor James Fillans (1808–52). The cost was defrayed by public subscription, which raised almost £1000. It was unveiled on 4 August 1848 and was originally located at the Kilmarnock Cross. On 28 March 1929 the statue was moved to the area of The Dick Institute just off the London Road because of the increase in traffic around the centre of the town.

It was described as 

His portrait (pictured above) is also shown in the Guildhall, London.

See also
Shaw Baronets

References

External links
 

|-

                   

1764 births
1843 deaths
Baronets in the Baronetage of the United Kingdom
Sheriffs of the City of London
19th-century lord mayors of London
19th-century English politicians
Members of the Parliament of the United Kingdom for English constituencies
UK MPs 1806–1807
UK MPs 1807–1812
UK MPs 1812–1818
People from East Ayrshire